Custo Dalmau (born 1959 as Ángel Custodio Dalmau Salmons in Tremp, Spain) is a fashion designer.

Career in fashion

He spent his childhood and adolescence in Barcelona, where he studied architecture. In 1980, he founded the label Custo Line with his brother David which in 1996 became Custo Barcelona and today is a label of Blue Tower S.L., Barcelona. Initially focusing on printed tops and T-shirts inspired by the looks of Californian surfers, the label meanwhile has added a full range of women's clothing, a men's line, as well as shoes and accessories.

Private life
Dalmau is married to Eva Vollmer who is responsible for the label's kids line Custo Growing.  Custo Dalmau is father to 2 daughters (one of which is not his biological daughter) and two sons.  He spends his time between the family home in Barcelona and the USA.

References

External links
 Custo Barcelona
 
 

1959 births
Living people
People from Pallars Jussà
Spanish fashion designers
Artists from Catalonia